is a train station in Ōmuta, Fukuoka Prefecture, Japan which is shared by JR Kyushu (operating the Kagoshima Main Line) and the Nishi-Nippon Railroad (Nishitetsu), operating the Tenjin Ōmuta Line.

Lines 

In addition, the station is the southern terminus of the Tenjin Ōmuta Line and is located 74.8 km from the starting point of the line at Tenjin.

Layout 
The JR Kyushu part of the station consists of a side and an island platform (platforms 1-3) serving three tracks. The Nishitetsu part consists of three tracks served by three bay platforms. One bay platform is one sided and is designated as platforms 4. The other two bays are two sided, platforms 5-6 serving one track and 7-8 another. A large number of passing loops and sidings are located between the JR and Nishitetsu platforms. In addition, another group of sidings branch off track 1 on the JR side.

Platforms

JR Kyūshū

Nishi-Nippon Railroad

Adjacent stations 

|-
|colspan=5 style="text-align:center;" |JR Kyūshū

|-
|colspan=5 style="text-align:center;" |Nishi-Nippon Railroad

History
In the next phase of expansion, the track was extended south to Takase (now ) opening as the new southern terminus on 1 April 1891. Ōmuta was opened on the same day as one of several intermediate stations on the new stretch of track. When the Kyushu Railway was nationalized on 1 July 1907, Japanese Government Railways (JGR) took over control of the station. On 12 October 1909, the station became part of the Hitoyoshi Main Line and then on 21 November 1909, part of the Kagoshima Main Line. On 1 July 1939, the Nishitetsu Tenjin Ōmuta Line commenced its service to the station. On 1 April 1987, with the privatization of Japanese National Railways (JNR), the successor of JGR, JR Kyushu took over control of the station.

Passenger statistics
In fiscal 2016, the station was used by an average of 3,014 passengers daily (boarding passengers only), and it ranked 61st among the busiest stations of JR Kyushu.

References

External links
Ōmuta Station (JR Kyushu)

Railway stations in Fukuoka Prefecture
Railway stations in Japan opened in 1891
Ōmuta, Fukuoka